Ernie Gonzalez (February 19, 1961 – May 15, 2020) was an American professional golfer who played on the PGA Tour in the 1980s. He won the only title of his career in 1986. By doing so, he became only the third left-handed golfer to win a Tour event.

Early life
Gonzalez was born in Chula Vista (a suburb of San Diego) on February 19, 1961. His father was of Mexican descent and his mother was Puerto Rican. He attended the United States International University, where he played on the golf team. He turned professional in 1983.

Career
Gonzalez played full-time on the PGA Tour from 1985 to 1989. He shot a 14-under-par 128 to edge Joey Sindelar by one stroke to win the rain-shortened 36-hole Pensacola Open in 1986 for his only Tour victory. The win by Gonzalez was the first by a left-handed golfer on the PGA Tour since Bob Charles at the 1974 Greater Greensboro Open. He also became only the third left-hander ever to win an event on Tour, after Charles and Sam Adams.

Gonzalez was friends with Phil Mickelson, a fellow left-hander and San Diegan. In 1988, Gonzalez's penultimate season on the Tour, he helped organize a practice round for Mickelson with Seve Ballesteros. This occurred during Mickelson's first PGA Tour event at the Shearson Lehman Hutton Andy Williams Open, which he entered as an amateur.

Later years and death
After losing his Tour card, Gonzalez worked as a golf instructor and a warehouseman at Wirtz Beverage Nevada. He has also played in a limited number of Nationwide Tour events, and in select PGA Tour events using exemptions. He lived with his family in Las Vegas, where he was employed at a beverage distributorship. The only event on the PGA Tour Champions that he participated in after turning 50 was the 2011 Senior Open Championship. However, he did not make the cut.

Gonzalez was married to Judy. Their son, David, was born in 1992, and Gonzalez later became teetotal to set a good example for him. His nephew was Brian Smock, who also played on the PGA Tour. Gonzalez was a Christian and attended Shadow Hills Baptist Church.

Gonzalez died on May 15, 2020, at a hospital in Chicago.  He was 59, and had been suffering from complications of Alzheimer's disease.

Professional wins (1)

PGA Tour wins (1)

*Note: The 1986 Pensacola Open was shortened to 36 holes due to rain.

Results in major championships

CUT = missed the half-way cut
Note: Gonzalez never played in The Open Championship.
Source:

Results in The Players Championship

CUT = missed the half-way cut

See also
1984 PGA Tour Qualifying School graduates
1985 PGA Tour Qualifying School graduates

References

External links

American male golfers
PGA Tour golfers
Left-handed golfers
Golfers from San Diego
Golfers from Nevada
United States International University alumni
People from Chula Vista, California
People from the Las Vegas Valley
American sportspeople of Mexican descent
American sportspeople of Puerto Rican descent
Deaths from Alzheimer's disease
Neurological disease deaths in Illinois
1961 births
2020 deaths